Sir David Alwyn Gore-Booth  (15 May 1943 – 31 October 2004) was a British diplomat, who served in the FCO from 1964 until 1998.

Sir David was appointed HM Ambassador to Saudi Arabia in 1993, before his final posting as British High Commissioner in New Delhi 1996–1998.  His father, Lord Gore-Booth GCMG was also High Commissioner to India 1960–1965.

Family and education
Of Anglo-Irish extraction, the Gore-Booth family was formerly seated at Artarman and Lissadell, and were created baronets in 1760.

Educated at Eton College and Christ Church, Oxford, David Gore-Booth was a twin son of Lord Gore-Booth GCMG, and married firstly in 1964, Jillian Sarah, née Valpy (marriage dissolved 1970), by whom he had one son: Paul Wyatt Julian Gore-Booth (heir presumptive to the baronetcy); he married secondly in 1977, Mary Elisabeth Janet, daughter of Sir David Muirhead with a step son.

Honours 
  –  (1997), CMG 1990;
  – KCVO (1997).

See also 
 Booth baronets
 Gore baronets

References

External links 
 www.burkespeerage.com

1943 births
2004 deaths
People educated at Eton College
Alumni of Christ Church, Oxford
Members of HM Diplomatic Service
Ambassadors of the United Kingdom to Saudi Arabia
High Commissioners of the United Kingdom to India
Knights Commander of the Royal Victorian Order
Knights Commander of the Order of St Michael and St George
HSBC people
David
Sons of life peers
20th-century British diplomats